Next:HD was an Italian high-definition satellite TV channel available in Italy as part of the SKY HD package on the SKY Italia satellite service. The channel closed on June 30, 2009, replaced by FOX HD.

Defunct television channels in Italy
Italian-language television stations
Television channels and stations established in 2006
Television channels and stations disestablished in 2009
2006 establishments in Italy
2009 disestablishments in Italy
HD-only channels